The Haunting of Sorority Row (known as Deadly Pledge in Australia, the United Kingdom, and France) is a 2007 Canadian supernatural horror television film directed by Bert Kish, starring Leighton Meester, Kailin See, Lisa Marie Caruk, Carlo Marks, Agam Darshi, Elyse Levesque, Meghan Ory, and Adrian Roman Petriw. The film premiered on October 6, 2007, on Global in Canada and on Lifetime in the United States.

Premise
The film revolves around a freshman at a college who believes a haunted house on sorority row is hiding sinister secrets. A sorority ritual leads to a ghost seeking revenge on sorority members.

Cast
 Leighton Meester as Samantha "Sam" Willows
 Kailin See as Jane Horten
 Lara Gilchrist as Jena Thorne
 Lisa Marie Caruk as Leslie
 Agam Darshi as Rachel
 Meghan Ory as Amanda
 Adrian Roman Petriw as Oliver
 Jessica Huras as Nikki Evans
 Carlo Marks as Spencer
 Elyse Levesque as Whitney Seasons
 David Patrick Flemming as Collin
 Patrick Keating as Plumber

Production
The film was shot in Vancouver. Its working title was Hell House.

Release
The film was premiered on October 6, 2007, on Lifetime on Global in Canada and on Lifetime in the United States as a Halloween tie-in. In France, NT1 broadcast the film on July 6, 2011, under the title Dark Intentions.

A barebones DVD was released in the United States on August 24, 2010, with Dolby Digital stereo sound and a 1.33:1 "full screen" aspect ratio. In France, the film was released in the DVD and Blu-ray formats on May 2, 2012, under the title Deadly Pledge. Both discs feature the proper "widescreen" presentation of the film and the blu-ray contains lossless stereo tracks in both the original English and dubbed French as well as lossy Dolby Digital 5.1 mixes in both languages. It is currently the only high-definition release of the film.

References

External links
 
 

2007 television films
2007 films
2007 horror films
2000s ghost films
2000s supernatural horror films
Canadian ghost films
Canadian supernatural horror films
English-language Canadian films
Films about fraternities and sororities
Films shot in Vancouver
Global Television Network original programming
Canadian horror television films
Lifetime (TV network) films
2000s Canadian films